Andrew Balogh is an American music producer, songwriter, film composer and saxophonist. Balogh contributed to the rapper Gunplay's favorably acclaimed album Living Legend, ranking #171 in the 2015 US Billboard Top 200, #17 in the 2015 US Billboard Top R&B/Hip-Hop Albums and #11 in the 2015 US Billboard Top Rap Albums.  Balogh tours with the band Sublime With Rome as their saxophonist and keyboardist.  Most recently, Balogh collaborated with actor Robert De Niro for the 2016 motion picture Dirty Grandpa, performing on the song "It Was a Good Day."

Biography 
Andrew started playing saxophone and piano when he was 7 years old.  He was passionate about jazz and classical music and started writing scores when he was in high school. Balogh attended Bob Cole Conservatory of Music, majoring in Jazz Studies and Composition.

Credits 
 Little Joy (album), side-project of The Strokes drummer Fabrizio Moretti 
 Role: Baritone Saxophone 
 Like a Drug (mixtape album) by rapper Honey Cocaine 
 Role: Producer on "Babysitta" 
 Living Legend by the rapper Gunplay
 Role: co-writer and producer on "From Da Jump"
 "It Was a Good Day". From the motion picture Dirty Grandpa
 Role: Performer
Property by social media stars Liane V and Jessica Lesaca 
Role: Songwriter and Producer
 "You and I" by singer Johnny Orlando 
 Role: Songwriter and Producer
 "Let Go" by singer Johnny Orlando 
 Role: Songwriter and Producer
"Guilty as Charged". From the motion picture "Tallulah (Film)"  
Role: Songwriter and Producer

Awards 

 2013 Hollywood Music And Media Awards - Special Recognition For Original Score - TV PROMO - Throw it Back (Reality Series TV Show)

References

External links 
 

Living people
Year of birth missing (living people)
Place of birth missing (living people)
American male saxophonists
21st-century American composers
American record producers
21st-century American saxophonists
American male composers
21st-century American male musicians